Frederick Roger Heron (October 6, 1944 – December 28, 2010) was a  professional American football defensive lineman in the National Football League (NFL). He played seven seasons for the St. Louis Cardinals.

Heron was drafted by the Green Bay Packers in the third round of the 1966 college draft, and Vince Lombardi traded him as a replacement for a lineman in the St. Louis Cardinals who had been forced to retire due to a heart murmur.

He suffered a back injury in a game in 1969 that led to an operation in April 1970, but resulted in ongoing pain for some time. By the end of his time with the Cardinals, he had become bothered by the violence of the sport, and in one interview stated "I watched the quarterback on the ground in obvious pain. I suddenly thought to myself, 'Have I turned into some kind of animal? This is a game, but I'm trying to maim somebody. The Cardinals released him from his contract after his back injuries led to another surgery in October 1972. After Heron's retirement from football he went on to work as the campus security assistant at Rio Calaveras Elementary School in his hometown of Stockton, California.

He died on  December 28, 2010.

Notes

1944 births
Players of American football from Stockton, California
American football defensive ends
American football defensive tackles
San Jose State Spartans football players
St. Louis Cardinals (football) players
2010 deaths